Handleyomys is a genus of Central and South American rodents in the tribe Oryzomyini of family Cricetidae. It was first described in 2002 to include two species from the Colombian Andes which were previously included in distinct and unrelated genera, Aepeomys and Oryzomys, but which turned out to be closely related. Later, in 2006, six other species were provisionally added from Oryzomys; these are expected to be placed in new genera in the future.

The genus now includes the following species:
Handleyomys alfaroi
Handleyomys chapmani
Handleyomys fuscatus
Handleyomys intectus
Handleyomys melanotis
Handleyomys rhabdops
Handleyomys rostratus
Handleyomys saturatior

Literature cited

 
Rodent genera